Medford Stanton Evans (July 20, 1934 – March 3, 2015), better known as M. Stanton Evans, was an American journalist, author and educator. He was the author of eight books, including Blacklisted by History: The Untold Story of Senator Joe McCarthy and His Fight Against America's Enemies (2007).

Early life and education
Evans was born in Kingsville in Kleberg County in South Texas, the son of Medford Bryan Evans, an author, college professor at Northwestern State University in Natchitoches, Louisiana, and official of the United States Atomic Energy Commission, and the classics scholar Josephine Stanton Evans. He grew up in Chattanooga, Tennessee, and the Washington, D.C., metropolitan area.

Evans graduated in 1955 magna cum laude from Yale University, Phi Beta Kappa, with a Bachelor of Arts in English, followed by graduate work in Economics at New York University under Ludwig von Mises.

Journalism
As an undergraduate, Evans was an editor for the Yale Daily News. It was at Yale that he read One Is a Crowd by Frank Chodorov. In The Conservative Intellectual Movement in America Since 1945, George H. Nash writes:

Upon graduation, Evans became assistant editor of The Freeman, where Chodorov was editor. The following year, he joined the staff of William F. Buckley's fledgling National Review (where he served as associate editor from 1960 to 1973), and became managing editor of Human Events, where he remained a contributing editor until his death.

Evans became a proponent of National Review co-editor Frank Meyer's "fusionism", a political philosophy reconciling the traditionalist and libertarian tendencies of the conservative movement. He argued that freedom and virtue are not antagonistic, but complementary:

In 1959, Evans became head editorial writer of The Indianapolis News, rising to editor the following year—at 26, the nation's youngest editor of a metropolitan daily newspaper—a position he held until 1974. In 1971, Evans became a commentator for the CBS Television and Radio Networks, and in 1980 became a commentator for National Public Radio, the Voice of America, Radio America and WGMS in Washington, D.C.

In 1974, he became a nationally syndicated columnist for The Los Angeles Times syndicate. Barry Goldwater wrote that Evans "writes with the strength and conviction and authority of experience."<ref>Fulton Lewis, Jr., "Washington Report", Reading Eagle, November 17, 1961, p. 10</ref> In a 1975 radio address, Ronald Reagan cited Evans as "a very fine journalist." In 1977, he founded the National Journalism Center, of which he served as director until 2002. The center sponsors young journalists getting established in the nation's capital. Cliff Kincaid of Accuracy in Media was among those who began their careers through Evans' auspices. In 1980, Evans became an adjunct professor of journalism at Troy University in Troy, Alabama, where he held the Buchanan Chair of Journalism.

From 1981 to 2002, he was publisher of Consumers' Research magazine. Evans expressed his journalistic philosophy as follows:

Political activism
Evans was present at Great Elm, the family home of William F. Buckley in Sharon, Connecticut, at the founding of Young Americans for Freedom, where, on September 11, 1960, he drafted YAF's charter, the Sharon Statement. Some conservatives still revere this document as a concise statement of their principles.

From 1971 to 1977, Evans served as chairman of the American Conservative Union (ACU). He was one of the first conservatives to denounce U.S. President Richard M. Nixon, just a year into his first term, co-writing a January 1970 ACU report condemning his record. Under Evans' leadership, the ACU issued a July 1971 statement concluding, "the American Conservative Union has resolved to suspend our support of the Administration." Evans often joked that he "never liked Nixon until Watergate."

In June 1975, the ACU called upon Ronald Reagan of California to challenge incumbent Gerald R. Ford, Jr., for the 1976 Republican presidential nomination. In June 1982, Evans and others met with now-President Reagan to warn him that the White House staff was undermining Reagan by making a deal with the Democratic Congress. (Reagan subsequently made such a deal in which for each $1 in higher taxes Congress promised $3 in spending cuts; Reagan delivered the tax hike, but Congress broke its promise and actually increased spending.)

In 1974, upon leaving the now-defunct The Indianapolis News after 15 years, he taught journalism at Troy University in Troy, Alabama for more than thirty years. From 1977 to 2002, he led the National Journalism Center in Washington, D.C., which was established with financial help from the conservative movement and brought promising beginning journalists to the nation's capital. He founded the Education and Research Institute. He was the president of the Philadelphia Society, a member of the Council for National Policy, sat on the advisory board of Young Americans for Freedom, and was a trustee of the Intercollegiate Studies Institute (ISI). He was an advisor to the National Tax Limitation Committee.

Honors
Evans was awarded honorary doctorates from Syracuse University, John Marshall Law School, Grove City College and Francisco Marroquín University. He is a past winner of two Freedom Foundation awards for editorial writing and the National Headliners Club Award for "consistently outstanding editorial pages." Evans was also awarded the Heartland Institute's Heartland Freedom Prize, Accuracy in Media's Reed Irvine award for excellence in journalism, the American Spectator's Barbara Olson Award for Excellence & Independence in Journalism, the Ashbrook Center for Public Affairs' John M. Ashbrook Award, the ISI's Regnery Award for Distinguished Institutional Service and four Freedoms Foundation George Washington medals. Troy University's Hall School of Journalism hosts an annual M. Stanton Evans symposium named in his honor. There is also the M. Stanton Evans Alumni Award.

Publications
Selected articles
 "Dark Horses." National Review (Aug. 3, 1979), pp. 985–988.
 "Unhand Them Spooks." National Review, vol. 32, no. 6 (Mar. 21, 1980), p. 357.
 "The Gender Gap Revisited." National Review, vol. 40, no. 18 (Sep. 16, 1988), pp. 41–60.
 "The Amerasia Affair: Historic Expose of Spying, Official Cover-up and Perjury." Human Events, vol. 52, no. 26 (Jul. 12, 1996).
 "Airport 2000: How to Break the Gridlock." Consumers' Research Magazine, vol. 83, no. 11 (Nov. 2000), p. 10.
 "Levin and Collins Trigger Disinformation: Senate Historian Clams Up When Queried on McCarthy." Human Events, vol. 59, no. 16 (May 12, 2003), p. 1.
 "The True Wall of Separation." American Spectator, vol. 40, no. 3 (Apr. 2007), pp. 26-30.

Books

 Revolt on the Campus. Washington, D.C.: Regnery (1961). Also at HathiTrust.
 The Fringe on Top: Political Wildlife Along the New Frontier. American Features (1963).
 The Liberal Establishment. New York: Devin-Adair (1965).
 The Politics of Surrender. New York: Devin Adair (1966).
 The Lawbreakers: America's Number One Domestic Problem. New Rochelle, New York: Arlington House (1968).
 The Future of Conservatism: From Taft to Reagan and Beyond. Holt, Rinehart and Winston (1968).
 Clear and Present Dangers: A Conservative View of America's Government. San Diego, Calif.: Harcourt Brace Jovanovich (1975). .
 Civil Rights Myths and Communist Realities. Conservative Society of America (1965).
 The Theme Is Freedom: Religion, Politics, and the American Tradition. Washington, D.C.: Regnery (1996).
 Blacklisted by History: The Untold Story of Senator Joe McCarthy and His Fight Against America's Enemies. New York: Random House (2007). .
 Stalin's Secret Agents: The Subversion of Roosevelt's Government, with Herbert Romerstein. New York: Simon & Schuster (2012).

Book contributions
 Introduction to Romney Behind the Image, by Antoni E. Gollan. Arlington, Virg.: Crestwood Books (1967).

References

External links
 
 Articles by M. Stanton Evans in Human Events''
 Books by M. Stanton Evans at HathiTrust
 Works by M. Stanton Evans at Internet Archives
 with Medford Stanton Evans by Stephen McKiernan, Binghamton University Libraries Center for the Study of the 1960s, August 6, 2009

1934 births
2015 deaths
American male journalists
Espionage in the United States
Yale College alumni
People from Kingsville, Texas
People from Chattanooga, Tennessee
People from Indianapolis
People from Hamilton, Virginia
Deaths from cancer in Virginia
Deaths from pancreatic cancer
Writers from Texas
Writers from Virginia
New Right (United States)
American anti-communists